Denison University is a private liberal arts college in Granville, Ohio. One of the earliest colleges established in the former Northwest Territory, Denison University was founded in 1831. The college was first called the Granville Literary and Theological Institution, later took the name Granville College, and, in the mid-1850s, was renamed Denison University, in honor of a key benefactor. The college enrolled 2300 students in Fall 2019 and students choose from 56 academic majors.

The college's intercollegiate athletic teams compete in the North Coast Athletic Conference, fielding 24 varsity teams in the NCAA Division III. Historically, the college has a strong rivalry with Kenyon College Swim & Dive. Denison is a member of the Five Colleges of Ohio and the Great Lakes Colleges Association.

History
On December 13, 1831, John Pratt, the college's first president and a graduate of Brown University, inaugurated classes at the Granville Literary and Theological Institution. Situated on a  farm south of the village of Granville; it was the second Baptist college west of the Allegheny mountains after Georgetown College, which was founded in 1829. While rooted in theological education, the institution offered students the same literary and scientific instruction common to other colleges of the day. The first term included 37 students, 27 of whom hailed from Granville; nearly half of these students were under fifteen years of age. The school was more of an academy than a college. The school's first Commencement, which graduated three classical scholars, was held in 1840.

In 1845, the institution, which at this point was male-only, officially changed its name to Granville College. In 1853, William S. Denison, a Muskingum County farmer, pledged $10,000 toward the college's endowment. Honoring an earlier commitment, the trustees accordingly changed the name of the institution to Denison University. They also voted to move the college to land then available for purchase in the village of Granville.

In the years leading up to the Civil War, many students and faculty members at Denison University became deeply involved in the anti-slavery movement. Professor Asa Drury, the chair of Greek and Latin studies, became the leader of a local anti-slavery society. Bancroft House, now a residential hall, served as a stop on the Underground Railroad for refugee slaves.

The roots of coeducation at Denison University began in December 1832 with the establishment of the Granville Female Seminary, founded by Charles Sawyer a year before Oberlin College launched the first coeducational college in the United States. The seminary was superseded by the Young Ladies' Institute, founded in 1859 by Dr. and Mrs. Nathan S. Burton. The Young Ladies' Institute was sold to Daniel Shepardson in 1868 and was renamed the Shepardson College for Women in 1886.

Shepardson College was incorporated as part of Denison University in 1900, with the two colleges becoming fully consolidated in 1927.

In 1887, Denison inaugurated a master's program, with resident graduates pursuing advanced studies in the sciences. Within a few years, the institution considered offering graduate programs on the doctoral level. In 1926, the board of trustees formalized a new curriculum that would make Denison University an exclusively undergraduate institution.

In the wake of Shepardson College's incorporation, Denison University made plans for enlargement of its campus. In 1916, the college sought the expertise of the Frederick Law Olmsted & Sons architectural firm. The resulting "Olmsted Plan" laid a foundation for expansion that has remained the guiding aesthetic for subsequent growth, establishing and maintaining a pedestrian-friendly campus, while also preserving scenic views of the surrounding hills and valleys. Expansion during this period included the acquisition of land to the north and east, the relocation of Shepardson College to the east ridge of College Hill, and the development of a new men's quadrangle beyond the library.

During World War II, Denison was one of 131 colleges and universities nationally that took part in the V-12 Navy College Training Program which offered students a path to a Navy commission.

While the college's origins were rooted in theological education, Denison University has been a non-sectarian institution since the 1960s. By 2005, the college reached its present size of approximately 2,250 students.

Presidents
John Pratt (1831–1837)
Jonathan Going (1837–1844)
Silas Bailey (1846–1852)
Jeremiah Hall (1853–1863)
Samson Talbot (1863–1873)
Elisha Andrews (1875–1879)
Alfred Owen (1879–1886)
Galusha Anderson (1887–1889)
Daniel B. Purinton (1890–1901)
Emory W. Hunt (1901–1912)
Clark W. Chamberlain (1913–1925)
Avery A. Shaw (1927–1940)
Kenneth I. Brown (1940–1950)
A. Blair Knapp (1951–1968)
Joel P. Smith (1969–1976)
Robert C. Good (1976–1984)
Andrew G. De Rocco (1984–1988)
Michele Tolela Myers (1989–1998)
Dale T. Knobel (1998–2013)
Adam S. Weinberg (2013–)

Campus

This includes a  biological reserve just east of campus, where professors of sciences, such as geology and biology, can hold class. The Denison Golf Club at Granville, an 18-hole course designed by Donald Ross, is just  from the academic campus and was donated to the university in 2014. In 2013, the university purchased and renovated the historic Granville Inn.

The first building in the "Greater Denison" plan, Swasey Chapel, was built at the center of the campus. The chapel seats 990 and plays host to notable campus events such as baccalaureate services, lectures, concerts, and academic award convocations.

There are 18 academic buildings on campus. Knapp Hall, built in 1968, houses humanities and social sciences majors such as Black Studies, Sociology/Anthropology, Educational Studies, Women and Gender Studies, Religion, Political Science, and Philosophy. Ebaugh Laboratories is dedicated to chemistry. Fellows Hall houses the foreign language departments, as well as History, Classics and International Studies. Also in this building is the Center for Off-Campus Study. 50% of Denison students study abroad during their junior year. Samson Talbot Hall is home to the biology department. Higley Hall, which was once known as the Doane Life Sciences Building, is home to Denison's two most popular majors: Economics and Communication. Olin Science Hall contains the astronomy, computer science, geosciences, physics, and mathematics majors. Barney-Davis Hall, one of the oldest academic buildings on campus, holds classes for English majors, Environmental Studies majors, and houses the Denison Writing Center, which provides free tutoring on any academic paper.

Doane Administration Building, one of the oldest buildings on campus, and Burton Morgan are also on academic quad (spill-over academic building), but they serve administrative purposes. The Bryant Arts Center opened in August 2009. Originally constructed in 1904 as a men's gymnasium (Cleveland Hall), it was later adapted as a student union. It was adapted and developed as the home of the studio/visual art and art history departments. The  facility has studios for ceramics, painting, printmaking, sculpture, photography and digital media. It also features fully electronic classrooms, open gallery spaces, an art history resource room, outdoor performance spaces, a common area for studio art seniors, and independent studios for faculty. Also on the fine arts quad is Doane Dance Building, Burton Music, Cinema MIX Lab, Burke Performance and Recital Hall, and the Michael D. Eisner Center for the Performing Arts, completed in 2019.

Built in 1937, Doane Library today houses more than 500,000 books and bound periodicals.

Swasey Observatory, which opened in June 1910, houses a 9-inch refracting telescope as well as two 8-inch reflecting telescopes.

Slayter Union features lounges, a snack bar, study tables, bookstore, a food market, student mailboxes and package services, a 302-seat auditorium and movie theater, a late-night restaurant, as well as offices for student organizations.

The campus landscape was designed by the Olmsted Brothers firm. "Greater Denison" was designed based on a layout of quadrangles throughout upper campus, designed to mirror the building functions. This was envisioned to help foster a sense of community among campus groups. The goal behind this plan was to be both aesthetically pleasing and functional for the university on top of a hill. The landscape design was planned to strategically preserve the natural topography, but also allow for logical and symmetrical arrangements of buildings within each quad.

Location 
Denison is located in Granville, Ohio, a New England-style village settled in 1805 by a colony of settlers from Granville, Massachusetts. Denison is 25 minutes from Columbus, Ohio, the 14th largest city in the United States.

Students
As of the 2018–19 school year, 2,300 students are enrolled at Denison, with a gender distribution of 49 percent male students and 51 percent female students. They come from all 50 states, Washington, DC; and 56 countries, with 82% from out-of-state.  A full-time faculty of 235 professors makes the student-to-faculty ratio 9:1.

Over the past several years, Denison University has increasingly attracted a diverse student population. For instance, 18 percent of students are first-generation college students and 33 percent are multicultural students.  While Denison has been recognized for its diversity in the past, it was cited by The New York Times in 2014 as one of America's "Most Economically Diverse Top Colleges." In that list, Denison is ranked at No. 11 in the list of the nation's top colleges and universities. Kenyon College was the only other Ohio school on the list, ranked at No. 80.

With a June 2018 endowment of $851 million, the endowment per student is $356,358. Some of this money goes towards financial aid. While the annual cost of attending is $63,130 per year, Denison awards nearly $60 million in need-based financial aid or merit-based academic scholarships. Furthermore, Denison University announced in September 2016 that they will partner with nonprofit I Know I Can to offer 20 full-tuition scholarships to high school students attending Columbus, Ohio city schools.

Academics

Denison's most popular majors, by 2021 graduates, were:
Econometrics & Quantitative Economics (66)
Biology/Biological Sciences (55)
Mass Communication/Media Studies (38)
International Business/Trade/Commerce	(29}
Management Science (27)
Research & Experimental Psychology (27)

Admissions
Denison University is one of the few universities that guarantees to meet the financial needs of all admitted students (including international students). As long as they are admitted, they will receive sufficient financial aid to afford a Denison education. Because of this policy, Denison recruits highly-achieving students from all over the United States and around the world each year.

In the admission season for fall 2021 entry, there were more than 9,500 applicants, with 28% of the applicant pool receiving offers to become members of the Class of 2025. Recent trends show an expanding interest from international student populations, with application submissions increasing from 2,447 in 2019 to 3,255 in 2021. Enrollment among international students has also increased during this period, from 97 newly enrolled international students to 131 over the three year span. Among freshman students who committed enrolling in Fall 2021, composite SAT scores for the middle 50% ranged from 1330 to 1550, while composite ACT scores for the middle 50% ranged from 30 to 35. For context, Denison practices test-optional admissions. Consequently, the SAT & ACT ranges reported here are based only the portion of the Denison student body that reported their scores, not the entire Denison student body. In terms of class rank, in Fall 2021, 76% of enrolled freshmen were in the top 10% of their high school classes. From a nationwide perspective, U.S. News & World Report categorizes Denison as "most selective," which is the highest degree of selectivity the magazine offers. Roughly 15 percent of the incoming class are admitted through athlete recruits. Denison University, like most major American higher education institutions, implements the holistic review admissions process. In addition to the standard results, extracurricular activities, awards, honors, character, community contributions, enthusiasm, specialties, etc. are criteria that are factored into the application process.

In January 2021, Denison University announced it has been selected as a QuestBridge partner college, becoming one of 48 universities in the country to be part of the program.

Student life

Denison is a strictly residential campus that features a mixture of historic and contemporary buildings. Housing options include single, double, triple, and quadruple rooms, as well as suites of six. There are various apartments across campus and several satellite houses for seniors. Most seniors and some juniors live in apartment style housing with their own bathroom, living room and kitchen.

The Homestead at Denison University is a non-traditional housing option.

Student organizations and involvement

Denison University is home to over 160 campus organizations  with more than 600 students in leadership positions.

The Denison Campus Governance Association (DCGA) is the Denison student governing body, in which all students are members.  The DCGA Student Senate is the primary representative body of students on Denison's campus, and it has been involved in various student initiatives: from postponing quiet hours in the fall of 2007 to drafting the Code of Academic Integrity adopted in the fall of 2009 to encouraging the University President to sign onto the Presidents' Climate Commitment.  The DCGA Finance Committee is responsible for allocating financial resources to campus organizations, providing the Denison community with opportunities to participate in club sports and intramurals, write for several publications, volunteer in the local community, learn about various cultures, and attend campus wide events. They hold an annual Denison Day (or "D-Day" for short) concert, which has featured artists such as T-Pain, The Roots, Andy Grammer, Ben Folds, RAC, Phillip Phillips, Danny Brown, Rufus Wainwright, Reel Big Fish, Matt and Kim, Hoodie Allen, Mos Def, Jay Sean, and Asher Roth.

The Alford Community Leadership & Involvement Center is the hub for student activities and community involvement.

The University Programming Council (UPC) is the main programming body on campus. A fully student operated organization, UPC annually brings in concerts, comedians, hypnotists, lectures and other forms of entertainment to campus. UPC also hosts a number of off-campus trips each year to the Columbus area and beyond. In addition to these events, UPC is well known for its annual events that have become a part of the Denison tradition: Week of Welcome, Denison Day (or D-Day), Gala, Aestavalia (spring festival), and Senior Send Off.

Denison Community Association (DCA) is student-led and operated umbrella organization for student service committees. In 2015, 86% of students participated in community service.

Founded in 1857, The Denisonian is the student-run newspaper and oldest student organization on campus and prints ten issues per semester as well as online at denisonian.com.

The Bullsheet is a student-run publication for news, humor and community dialog that is printed daily and delivered to campus buildings. It was founded in 1979  to combat student apathy, and it remains central to campus culture by providing an open forum for free speech.

Fraternity and sorority life
Denison's fraternity and sorority community strives to be a model of excellence through individuals, chapters, and councils that perpetually strives for congruence in word and deed with the prescribed and shared principles of fraternity. It is Denison's vision that individuals, chapters, and councils demonstrate all of the values to which they pledged.

Today our community has grown to over 34% of Denison students, within 20 Greek-lettered organizations, and 4 governing councils. The National Pan-Hellenic Council (NPHC), Multicultural Greek Council (MGC), Panhellenic Council (PHC), and the Interfraternity Council (IFC) pride themselves on individuality, while recognizing common values and principles.

In the 1980s, over 70% of the student body belonged to a fraternity or sorority organization. Fraternities and sororities at Denison are overseen by four ruling bodies: the Interfraternity Council or IFC for fraternities, the National Panhellenic Conference for sororities, the National Pan-Hellenic Council for historically African American fraternities and sororities, and the Multicultural Greek Council for historically multicultural fraternities and sororities.

The active IFC fraternities are Beta Theta Pi, Delta Chi, Lambda Chi Alpha, Kappa Sigma, Phi Kappa Psi, and Sigma Chi.  The Panhellenic Conference sororities are Delta Delta Delta, Delta Gamma, Kappa Kappa Gamma, Kappa Alpha Theta, and Pi Beta Phi. Delta Sigma Theta, Alpha Kappa Alpha, Phi Beta Sigma, Alpha Phi Alpha and Sigma Gamma Rho operate under the National Pan-Hellenic Council system. The Multicultural Greek Council is host to the chapters of Sigma Lambda Gamma, the Eta Colony of Alpha Sigma Rho, Phi Iota Alpha, Lambda Theta Alpha Latin Sorority Inc. and the Gentlemen of Chi Sigma Tau – Zeta Chapter.

Currently, Denison's Sigma Phi Epsilon chapter is suspended from official recognition for violations of the Student Code of Conduct, while its Kappa Sigma chapter was restored to good standing at the beginning of the Fall semester of 2014. Additionally, an unrecognized chapter of Phi Gamma Delta (FIJI) operates at Denison alongside KZ, an unrecognized local fraternity. Sigma Alpha Epsilon was removed from campus following a hazing incident in 2001. The school administration does not extend recognition to these three latter groups, and as such, they are sometimes referred to by the student body as "unrecognized fraternities." Previous fraternities to exist on campus, but are now inactive, include Delta Upsilon and Alpha Tau Omega.

Religious Life
Denison is not religiously affiliated. However, there are religious organizations that add to the dynamic campus culture. Within religious life, Denison seeks to recognize the college's diversity and strives to create opportunities of inter religious experiences and dialogue to promote understanding and acceptance. Some of the larger organizations include Denison Christian Community, Newman Catholic Club, Hillel (Judaism), Muslim Students Association, and Agape Christian Fellowship. Other organizations represent the Quaker, Buddhist, Young Life, Sikh, and Hindu groups on campus. The Open House-Center for Religious and Spiritual Life, located on the South Quad of campus, is not exclusively for spiritual use. Students of all faiths and those with no faith tradition are welcome to come enjoy the homelike atmosphere while they study, enjoy a snack, play board games, meet new friends, or use the house for meetings of a non-religious nature.

Traditions and folklore
D-Day, the successor to the college's old Scrap Day, is a celebration of the entire college, put on once a year by the University Programming Council (UPC).

Kirtley Mather, Class of 1909, named the tallest peak in Alaska's Aleutian Peninsula "Mt. Denison." In 1978, a group of students, professors, and alumni successfully scaled the mountain—a feat repeated nearly 20 years later by another Denison group.

Denison has one of the few remaining college cemeteries in Ohio. Among those buried on Sunset Hill are Jonathan Going, the college's second president, and Elisha Andrews, its sixth.

Arts 
The arts are prominent at Denison University. Students can major or minor in theatre, music, visual art, studio art, art history, dance, or cinema. Denison also hosts a variety of annual festivals and series including The Vail Series, The Beck Series, The Tutti Festival, and The Bluegrass Festival.

The Vail Series began in 1979 as the result of a financial gift from Mary and Foster McGaw in honor of Jeanne Vail, class of 1946. Michael Morris, who previously worked as the executive director of the Midland Theatre, Newark, Ohio, was appointed to be the director of the program in 2014. According to an article by the Newark Advocate, The Vail Series is an "acclaimed visiting artist program" where artists are encouraged to both perform and interact with students. Tickets to the Vail Series are free to students. Former performers include Yo-Yo Ma, Itzhak Perlman, Renée Fleming, Wynton Marsalis, Jessye Norman, and Chris Thile and Edgar Meyer among others. In 2014, the university announced that ETHEL will become their first ensemble-in-residence. They performed their multimedia concert "Documerica" on campus during the spring of 2016 and received honorary degrees from the college at the commencement ceremony in 2017.

The Beck Series is associated with the creative writing program at Denison, and it brings a variety of authors to campus to read their work and interact with students. Former visitors include Pulitzer Prize winner Eudora Welty, National Book Award winner Alice Walker, Playwright and Oscar-winning screenwriter Tom Stoppard, Orange is the New Black author, Piper Kerman, and W. S. Merwin among others.

The Tutti Festival is a semi-annual festival that features original works of music, art, dance, poetry, fine arts, and theater by professors, students, and visiting artists.

The college hosts an annual free Bluegrass Festival. This weekend-long celebration includes multiple concerts, instrument workshops, and jam sessions.

The campus radio station, WDUB a.k.a. The Doobie, features 24-hour programming and broadcasts both online at www.doobieradio.com. The station was notably featured in American Eagle stores across the country through the summer of 2009. The Doobie was also ranked by The Princeton Review as one of the best college radio stations in the nation.

In 2016, Denison renovated and opened the Denison Art Space in Newark as part of the Thirty-One West development in Downtown Newark.

Construction began in 2017 on the Michael D. Eisner Center for the Performing Arts, named for former CEO of The Walt Disney Company Michael Eisner, who graduated from Denison in 1964. When completed, the building will house the departments of music, dance, and theatre, as well as multi-disciplinary performance and rehearsal spaces.

Athletics

Denison is a member of the NCAA Division III and the North Coast Athletic Conference (NCAC) since the conference's formation in 1984. As a part of the 10-member conference Denison boasts a league-record 11 Dennis M. Collins Awards which is given to the NCAC school that performs best across the conference's 23 sponsored sports: 11 for men and 12 for women. Denison additionally has 45 club and intramural sports. Denison won nine consecutive All-Sports Awards between 1997–1998 and 2005–2006. Denison's remaining two awards were earned in 1985–86 and 2008–2009.

In 2001, the Denison Women's Swimming and Diving team captured the school's first NCAA Division III national championship by snapping Kenyon College’s streak of 17-consecutive national championships.  Following this, the Denison Men's Swimming and Diving team defeated Kenyon to capture the 2011 NCAA National Title by 1 point ending the Lords' 31-year streak of championships. Denison men won the national title in 2015–2016 and in 2017–2018.

In both men's and women's swimming and diving, Denison has posted 47 consecutive top-10 finishes at the NCAA Division III championships.  During that span, Denison has placed either second or third, nationally, 26 times.

Denison alumnus Woody Hayes (Class of ’35) spent three seasons as the head football coach at Denison (1946–48). In 1947 and 1948 he guided the Big Red to undefeated seasons.

In 1954, Keith Piper took over as the head football coach, a position he would remain in for 39 seasons. Piper won a school record, 200 games and in 1985 he guided the program to their first 10–0 season with his antique single-wing offense.  Denison qualified for the NCAA Division III playoffs that season before falling to Mt. Union in the opening round.

Women's basketball at Denison has emerged as a national contender under head coach Sara Lee.  Denison's 2010–11 squad completed the first 28–0 regular season in women's basketball in the NCAC and have advanced to the NCAA Division III Tournament for the seventh time in school history and their sixth time out of the last seven seasons.
Men's basketball at Denison won the 2015-2016 NCAC tournament championship. They appeared in the NCAA tournament.

The Denison men's and women's lacrosse programs have had their share of conference and national success.  The two programs have combined for 28 NCAA Division III tournament berths. In 1999 and 2001 the Denison men's lacrosse team advances to the semifinal (Final 4) of the NCAA Division III Tournament [10] and most recently, in 2009, the Big Red advanced to the national quarterfinals of the NCAC Tournament before falling to Gettysburg.

In 2008, the Denison women's tennis team advanced to the NCAA semifinals, eventually winning the consolation match to place third overall, marking the program's best national finish. That same year the doubles team of sophomore Marta Drane and freshman Kristen Cobb advanced to the championship match of the Division III Doubles championship before falling to Brittany Berckes and Alicia Menezes of Amherst in the finals.

The Denison University Squash Team has spent the majority of its time as the #1 club team in the nation and competes with some of the top varsity teams across the nation.

The Denison women's soccer team advanced to the NCAA quarterfinals for the second time in school history in 2010. The previous appearance occurred in 2005. Overall the program has qualified for the NCAA Tournament 14 times.

Denison boasts 49 NCAA postgraduate scholars and 87 Academic All-Americans.

Career center 
In the spring of 2016, Denison University announced that the Austin E. Knowlton Foundation pledged $9.3 million towards the Center for Career Exploration, now known as The Austin E. Knowlton Center for Career Exploration. According to the Newark Advocate, this money is devoted to supporting the college's work in creating the "benchmark program" for transitioning students from the liberal arts into the professional world. In 2017, the Knowlton Center was honored by the National Association of Colleges and Employers (NACE) when President Adam Weinberg was given the Career Services Champion Award.

The Knowlton Center provides programs beginning in a student's first year to prepare them for life after college including job and graduate school search assistance, career exploration, alumni mentoring, "first look" trips, and internship assistance. The center also provides internship funding to students on an application basis, ranging from $100-$4,000 to offset costs incurred during an internship.

Denison University is one of the eight members of the CLIMB internship program. A prestigious internship program in Denver that only partners with Denison, Harvard, Middlebury, M.I.T., Northwestern, Stanford, Wesleyan, and Yale.

Alumni can also take advantage of programming including networking, career coaching  and a program called "Designing Your Next Five" based on the book Designing Your Life by Bill Burnett and Dave Evans.

Notable faculty and alumni
Denison alumni include scholars (such as the former president of Princeton University William G. Bowen), Hollywood superstars, entrepreneurs, presidents and executives of Fortune 500 companies.

Among the faculty, its current economics professor Sohrab Behdad founded the Economics Department of the University of Tehran, and the former professor William Rainey Harper served as the first president of The University of Chicago.

Faculty
 David Baker (1984–)
 Paul Alfred Biefeld (1911–1943)
 Theodore Burczak (1995–)
 Andy Carlson (1999–2018)
 Asa Drury (1834–1836)
 Peter Grandbois (2010–)
 William Rainey Harper (1876–1878)
 Anthony J. Lisska (1969–) 
 Kirtley Fletcher Mather (1918–1924)
 Margot Singer (2005–)

Alumni 

Notable alumni include actors Steve Carell, Hal Holbrook, and Jennifer Garner; SNL comedian Alex Moffat; entertainer John Davidson; Hall of Fame college football coach Woody Hayes; ESPN president George Bodenheimer; Turner Broadcasting System Senior Vice President James Anderson; drag queen and activist Nina West, former member of Turkish Parliament and current consultant to The Coca-Cola Company Mehmet Cem Kozluformer; United States Senator Richard Lugar; Indy car racer Bobby Rahal; playwright Jeffrey Hatcher; artist Ned Bittinger; author Pam Houston, James Frey; former Disney Chairman and CEO Michael Eisner; American criminologist and father of "evidence-based policing" Lawrence Sherman; former Ohio Attorney General Jim Petro; former Princeton University President William Bowen; professor of religion at Goucher College and theologian at the Washington National Cathedral Kelly Brown Douglas; Randolph Marshall Hollerith, Dean of the Washington National Cathedral.

See also
 "Think of Laura" - Christopher Cross song about the death of Denison University college student Laura Carter

References

External links

Official website
Official athletics website

 
Private universities and colleges in Ohio
Education in Licking County, Ohio
Liberal arts colleges in Ohio
Five Colleges of Ohio
Educational institutions established in 1831
Buildings and structures in Licking County, Ohio
Tourist attractions in Licking County, Ohio
1831 establishments in Ohio